Mahamahopadhyaya Pandit Ram Avatar Sharma (1877–1929) was an Indian Sanskrit scholar and academic, apart from being an indologist and historian. He was born in a Bhumihar Brahmin family of scholars and pursued the same path of scholarship, becoming the professor of Sanskrit in University of Patna in pre-independence years. He was also a renowned Indologist. Dr. Rajendra Prasad, the first President of India and a favourite student of Pandit Sharma, was instrumental in getting his works published after his death. His son, Professor Pandit Nalin Vilochan Sharma was also a professor of Hindi Literature in University of Patna and started the Nai Kavita; New Poetry movement in Hindi literature.

Early life and education
Pandit Ramavatara Sarma was born the son of a Brahmin Sanskrit guru, Dev Narayan Pandey, on 6 March in Chapra which lies on the northern bank of the river Ganges in the state of Bihar. His father asked him to join him in his work when he was 12 so young Ramavatara headed for India's greatest seat of Sanskrit learning, Varanasi, and became a disciple of Gangadhar Shastri, the most famous guru of the day.

He passed the Kavyateerth examination at the age of 15 and wrote his first book the same year, Dheernaishadham. He took admission to Queen's College in Benaras which was patronised by Dr Annie Besant and completed his Sahityacharya the same year, topping the list. But one of the professors at Queen's College, Dr Vennis, happened to comment that were he to acquire some knowledge of English he would fare better.

At this Ramavtar Sarma went right off to pawn his only prized possession, his lota and borrow a copy of the Encyclopædia Britannica which he read through once. After that all his life he was able to tell which word appeared on which page, in which column, after which word and before which. This was the time he changed his name from Pandey to Sarma which roughly means 'the knowledgeable one'.

Career
Mahamahopadhyaya Pt. Ramavtar Sharma was a genius of very high order. He had a brilliant career as a student of Sanskrit in which he earned the oriental degrees of Kavyatirtha, Vyakarnacharya, Sahityacharya, etc., having received his education under the guidance of his father at an early stage and later under the tutorship of the famous Pandit Mahamahopadhyaya Gangadhar Shastri of Queen's College, Benares. He also had his education in modern subjects in English and passed all his examinations from entrance up to M.A., having topped and received prizes in most of them. He left Benaras because conditions back home were bad. He took up his first job at Chapra High School but returned to Benaras in 1901 to take up lectureship at Central Hindu College. It was at this time that he defeated in shastrarth his guru, Gangadhar Shastri as well as Maharshi Shraddhanand. His guru had tears running down his cheeks at his disciple's show of erudition but he said, 'Since you have put me down in my own city, go, may none of your work be ever completed.'

At the time of his death in 1929, Ramavtar Sarma's house, family and lexicon were all incomplete. This story was told me by his eldest and dearest daughter, Indumati Tewari who herself had two MA degrees from Benaras Hindu University, having topped both subjects, Sanskrit and Hindi. However, when Dr Annie Besant tried to impose norms of attire on the lecturers, Ramavtar Sarma reacted,'Clothes are for comfort. I shall not wear coat and trousers to college.' He went back home but the fledgling university at Patna needed someone to head its combined department of Hindi and Sanskrit and invited him over. He joined Patna University in 1907.

In 1908 he was asked by Sir Asutosh Mukherji of Calcutta University to deliver the famous Basu-Mallick lecture. This was an exposition on Vedantism which was later delivered at Oxford University. This was regarded as the final word on the subject and stands unrefuted to this day.

Meanwhile, the founder of world-renowned Benaras Hindu University was doing the rounds at Patna, hoping to rope in Ramavtar Sarma for his pet project at BHU, the first-ever college of Indology. Ramavtar relented when he failed to win the well-known Premchand Raichand scholarship which went to Radha Kumud Mukherji, a much junior man. He joined BHU as Principal, Oriental College of Indology.

Legends grew around him. There was an incident involving the then Prince of Wales, later King Edward VIII. Madan Mohan Malviya had requested all faculty members to be attired in formal clothes including the pugree. However, as the royal cavalcade approached Ruia Hostel where Indology classes were held, Ramavtar Sarma went and stood on the verandah, clad in his dhoti and chauband. Malviya happened to catch sight of him and ordered the cavalcade away. When the next day Ramavtar was asked for an explanation, he arrived at Malviya's office along with a bundle of his clothes, saying 'From tomorrow, these will take classes, not I.' He added, 'What you pay me for my erudition is a pittance. You cannot tell me how I should dress.' Malviya agreed.

Much later Indumati Tewari, his eldest daughter explained, 'That was a day for a dip in the Ganges and my mother gathered all us children and took us to Assi Ghat. She also took the keys to the almirah in which Baba's clothes were. Since he never raised his voice to her, he simply put on his normal clothes and went to college.'

However, in 1922, he decided to return to Patna, explaining, 'My Bihar is poor and needs me.'

There came to Patna University as Principal, another erudite scholar from Oxford University, Sir Charles Russell, who was interested both in Sanskrit and Philosophy being an excellent scholar himself. He asked Ramavtar Sarma if he could guide him in the perusal of one of the most difficult books in the language. Sir Charles brought along two copies of the book, one for himself and the other for Ramavtar, who simply pushed the book away. Sir Charles was stunned by the fact that anyone could have such a book at his fingertips. Thereafter Sir Charles had many thought-provoking sessions on just about any subject with Ramavtar Sarma, his admiration rising with each.

Ramavtar's style of writing verse was such that scholars of the era were convinced that he would author the fifth Veda. Hopes were also expressed that he would be able to decode the Indus Valley Script. It was he who rescinded the Ashokan script.
It was again Ramavtar who dated Sanskrit poet Bhasa as well as identified the real Kalidas from a likely trio. An essay on this last subject appeared in English in The Hindustan Review, published from Patna.

The debate that the Vedas were a divine creation was timeless. To settle the issue, Ramavtar started sending off some slokas to a national Sanskrit magazine printed from Poona. He carried on the joke on the academic fraternity for six whole months. All Sanskrit scholars took them to be from some Veda or the other. Then at last he revealed that they were 'Swarachit' or self-composed.

His memory was phenomenal. Once a young writer came to him and read out about 55 pages of his book which he hoped to submit to the publishers the next day. It rained heavily that night and the first 55 pages were washed away. The writer was desperate. He confided to a friend about the fact that he had read just those pages out to Ramavtar. The friend took him right back to Ramavtar's house on Patna's Exhibition Road. Ramavtar was able to dictate verbatim every page that the writer had lost.

Ramavtar Sarma was a radical thinker. For one thing, he anticipated the genetic theory by pronouncing that close relatives ought not to marry (as it is Hindu religion forbids it) and he maintained that if a girl from Bengal were to marry a boy from the Punjab their progeny would be highly intelligent. He believed that only the most intelligent persons must have several children and that those with mental illnesses must desist.

He did not believe in reincarnation—this sent the Brahmin community of his times into frenzies of condemnation. But as he simply put it, 'When the natural receptacle of the brain and mind is gone, where does memory reside?' He considered that all the world is 'a series of waves in the unitary Divine ocean of knowledge.'

These words are from his book, Parmarath Darshan with which he added a new chapter to the six systems of Hindu philosophy. His views on the Puranas contained in The Philosophy of the Puranas won him the Buch Metaphysics Award. Another book, Chapters from Indian Psychology was also hailed as being much ahead of those times.

At his death on 3 April 1929 Indologist K P Jaiswal said, 'He belonged to the race of Kapil, Kannad and Kalidas.'
The Bihar-Orissa Journal wrote that his lexicon 'would have gladdened the heart of the universal Voltaire. The Patna College Magazine dated 3 April 1929 wrote, that he was 'a consummate scholar of encyclopaedic knowledge, a powerful rationalistic thinker ... of marked poetic talents. We shall not see the likes of him again.' Principal Horne of Patna College said, 'His death is a crushing loss to the world of scholarship.' The Gaiwad Oriental Series Institute wrote, '(His death) removes from the field of Indology and ardent worker and a specialist in lexicography.'

Personal life
He was survived by five daughters and three sons. His eldest daughter, Indumati, was herself a great scholar of Sanskrit. His eldest son, Nalin Vilochan Sarma, was a writer and poet and founded a new style of poetry, Nakenwaad. His collection of short stories, Vish ke Daant is still taught in Patna University and he too died early while he was the Head of the Hindi Department of Patna University. He also had a daughter Mandirmani who was one of the surviving twins he had who married a pilot.

Legacy
India's first President, Dr Rajendra Prasad, was one of Ramavtar's favourite students. It was he who was instrumental in getting several of Sarma's books into print.

An article on Ramavtar Sarma entitled 'India's Greatest Forgotten Genius' by Shruti Shukla first appeared in The Hindustan Times, Patna Edition, dated 5 September 1986.

List of works

Sanskrit and Pali
 Vividh gadya-padyatmak rachnayen 1903–06; published in monthly journals Mitragoshthi and Suktisudha from Kashi
 Saduktikarnamrit, based on ancient archival material for Asiatic Society of Bengal, period 1903–10.
 Priyadarshiprashastyah, translated only Pali into Sanskrit and English for University of Calcutta, 1910.
 Parmarthdarshan, sutrabadh darshan-granth – vartik sahit; published in Kashi in the years 1911–12 and 13. Bhashya's first chapter published in Sanskrit journal Sanskrit-Sanjivan in 1943.
 Vangamaymahanav, shlokbaddh Sanskrit vishwakosh; published between 1911–25; Gyanmandal Limited, Varanasi.
 Mudgardutam; vyangya-kavya; vyakriti of Kalidasa's Meghadūta; published in Sharda patrika.
 Bharatiyamitivrittam, History of India in Sanskrit.

English
 Philosophy of the Puranas (Purandarshan); 1902, got Buch Metaphysics Prize for it, unpublished.
 Chapters from Indian Psychology (Bharatiya manovigyan ke kuch adhyaya), 1904, got Buch Metaphysics Prize for it, unpublished.
 Gopal Basu Mallick lectures on Vedantism (Vedanta par vyakhyan), 1908, published by University of Calcutta.
 A Thesis on the Age of Kalidasa (Kalidasa ke samay ka nirupan); 1909, Published by Hindustan Review.
 Elementary Textbook of Eternal Law (Parmarthdarshan ki angrezi bhumika); 1911, unpublished.

Hindi
 Europiya Darshan; 1905, published by Kashi Nagari Pracharini Sabha.
 Hindi Bhasha Tatva; published as lecture series, published by Kashi Nagari Pracharini Sabha.
 Hindi Vyakaran; 1907, published in monthly journal Devnagar from Calcutta.
 Hindi Vyakaran aur rachna ki shikshan-paddhati, 1910, published by education department of Bengal.
 Vividh-vishayak Nibandh; 1912–13, published in Saraswati, Sudha and Madhuri.
 Mudgaranandcharit; publication year unknown, published in Nagari Pracharini Patrika.
 Padyamaya Mahabharata, publication year unknown.

See also
 List of Indian writers

References

1929 deaths
Scholars from Bihar
20th-century Indian historians
Indian Indologists
Indian spiritual writers
People from Chhapra
Indian Sanskrit scholars
Sanskrit writers
1877 births
Writers from Patna
19th-century Indian historians
20th-century Indian linguists
English-language writers from India
Scholars in British India
Historians in British India